Unacademy is an Indian educational technology company that provides online educational platform with its headquarters in Bangalore, Karnataka. It prepares students for various competitive exams(like JEE, NEET, UPSC, CA, GATE, UPSC NDA, CUET, Boards etc.), as well as provides content on foundational (K-12) and skill building courses (programming, photography, entrepreneurship, etc).

It was founded by Gaurav Munjal, Hemesh Singh and Roman Saini in 2015. As of May 2022, Unacademy was valued at USD $3.44 billion.

Product and services 
In February 2019, Unacademy launched its subscription-based model, Unacademy Plus. The Unacademy Plus Subscription provides students access to live courses by educators across the country in English and 14 Indian languages including Hindi, Punjabi, Telugu,Tamil, Malayalam, Marathi, Bengali,Gujarati, Bhojpuri, etc.

In 2020, Unacademy launched Graphy, that helps creators launch their online school in under 60 seconds. In May 2022, Unacademy opened its first offline learning centre in Kota, Rajasthan.

History 
Unacademy started off as a YouTube channel created by Gaurav Munjal in 2015 when he was an engineering student in Mumbai. Gaurav uploaded a short video tutorial on computer graphics on his YouTube channel to help his peers prepare for the semester exams. In December 2015, Gaurav Munjal roped in two of his friends, Hemesh Singh and Roman Saini, and launched Unacademy app to create free interactive content.

By 2017, it had over 1 million learners, 5000 plus registered educators and over 40,000 classes launched. In January 2022, Unacademy became one of the founding members of IAMAI's India EdTech Consortium along with other edtech firms like Simplilearn, UpGrad, Byjus and Vedantu.

Acquisitions 
In 2018, Unacademy acquired WiFiStudy for $10 million, a Jaipur-based online exam preparation and learning platform founded by Dinesh Godara in 2013. In March 2020 acquired Kreatryx, an online preparation platform for GATE and ESE. In the same year, Unacademy acquired CodeChef, an educational initiative for the programming community founded by Indian billionaire Bhavin Turakhia in 2009, PrepLadder, a postgraduate medical entrance exam preparation platform, in a cash and stock deal worth $50 million, Mastree, and Coursavy, a Union Public Service Commission (UPSC) test preparation platform for 1000 crores

Unacademy shut down the operations at Mastree after a year of acquisition. In 2021 Unacademy acquired TapChief, Rheo TV and Swiflearn.

Funding and Valuation 
In January 2017, it received Series A funding of $4.5 million from Blume Ventures and Nexus Venture Partners.

In 2019, Unacademy launched its subscription-based model, Unacademy Plus and reported an ARR of US$30 million. In the same year, Unacademy secured nearly $87 million from investors, such as SAIF Partners, Sequoia Capital India, SAIF Partners, Steadview Capital, Nexus Ventures and Blume Ventures. Unacademy was the second company in India to receive a direct investment from Facebook.

In the year 2020, Unacademy achieved a unicorn status after closing a $150m investment round with SoftBank Vision Fund at a $1.5 billion valuation. In the same year, it was named as one of the official sponsors of the Indian Premier League (IPL) for year 2020–22. In November 2020, it raised a Series -G funding from Tiger Global Management and Dragoneer Investment Group at a $2 billion valuation.

In January 2021, Tiger Global, Dragoneer Investment Group, Steadview Capital and General Atlantic purchased $50 million-worth of shares from existing investors. In August 2021, Unacademy raised $440 million in a Series H funding round led by Temasek, with participation from General Atlantic, Tiger Global, and SoftBank Vision Fund, Aroa Ventures, the family office of OYO Founder Ritesh Agarwal, and Deepinder Goyal, co-founder and CEO at Zomato. In September 2021 it announced ESOPs (employee stock ownership plan) buyback programme worth $10.5 million for employees and teachers.

Activities 

 During the pandemic in 2020, Unacademy opened its platform to schools and colleges to conduct Live Classes for their students.
 In the same year, the company launched its Legends on Unacademy, an initiative to bring together known personalities from different walks of life such as sports, arts, business, leadership and conducts curated lessons on their subject of expertise and life lessons. Among the personalities who delivered live lectures are Brian Lara, Brett Lee, Jonty Rhodes, Virat Kohli, Sunil Gavaskar, Sourav Ganguly,  former diplomat Shashi Tharoor, retired IPS Officer Kiran Bedi, Zev Siegl, Mary Kom, Randi Zuckerberg, Abhijit Banerjee, BCCI chief Sourav Ganguly, Wikipedia co-founder Jimmy Wales and Infosys Foundation chairperson Sudha Murthy.
 In May 2021, Unacademy launched ‘Educate India’ - an initiative supported by Feeding India, that provided free 1-year subscriptions, worth ₹19 crores to 10,000 children.
 Unacademy has signed MoUs with various state governments including the governments of Karnataka, Odisha, Telangana, Gujarat, Himachal Pradesh and National Space Defense Center to support meritorious students in these states to prepare for various competitive exams like K-12, IIT-JEE, NEET UG, and Defence exams
 In December 2021 Unacademy had launched their Shikshodaya initiative that aims to educate over 5,00,000 girl students across India.

Criticism 
In January 2020, Unacademy suffered a huge data leak that led to the exposure of personal data of nearly 22 million users. The breach included user records of employees from Reliance Industries, TCS, HDFC, SBI, Infosys, Cognizant, Wipro, Accenture, Facebook and Google, among others. The records appeared for sale on a dark web forum, with the seller asking for $2000. Unacademy officials later confirmed that nearly 11 million accounts were compromised, but nothing valuable was leaked or misused. Unacademy re-assured the fact that no sensitive information has been compromised in their official statement on the issue.

In May 2021, it was criticized for posting questions in their Test Series that were religiously inclined and were claimed to be anti-national in nature. Learners complain that often their Educators are removed from the system, leaving the syllabus mid-way. Recently, Unacademy was under scrutiny for laying off both Educators as well as full-time employees.

Brajesh Maheshwari who is the co-founder and director of Allen Career Institute warned its teachers of leaving the institute and moving to the other offline coaching centres after Unacademy opened a coaching centre in Kota and had roped in several teachers from Allen. Unacademy also suspended contracts Of Educators to cut cost due to funding winter in July 2022.

PrepLadder 
In 2021 a Sri Lankan company Medical Joyworks filed a suit in the Bombay Civil Court alleging that PrepLadder, a subsidiary of Unacademy, has plagiarized Medical Joyworks's Prognosis application and other property. The court in its order on 20 September 2021 stated that "Unacademy cannot use its PrepLadder app, website and any other content until all proprietary information, know-how, and technology belonging to Medical Joyworks have been removed to the satisfaction of Medical Joyworks and an independent auditor."

However, on 24 September 2021, the Bombay High Court stayed this judgement when the legal counsel appearing for PrepLadder alleged that the civil court's order was completely erroneous since the civil judge had passed it without jurisdiction.

Awards and nominations 

 2018: TechNode Global- Resilience Awards
 2018: IAMAI- Startup of the Year
 2020: Named among the GSV Global EdTech 50.
 2021: Ranked first in the LinkedIn Top Startups List for India (2021)

References

External links 

 

Indian educational websites
Educational websites
Educational technology companies
Education companies of India
Indian companies established in 2015
2015 establishments in Karnataka
Internet properties established in 2015
Online tutoring
Virtual learning environments
Distance education institutions based in India
Test preparation companies
Cybercrime in India